The following television stations broadcast on digital channel 34 in the United States:

 K16IL-D in Kanab, Utah, on virtual channel 8, which rebroadcasts KTTA-LD
 K22JJ-D in Milton-Freewater, Oregon
 K24HJ-D in Manti, etc., Utah, on virtual channel 4, which rebroadcasts KTVX
 K34AC-D in Yuma, Colorado, on virtual channel 3, which rebroadcasts KCDO-TV
 K34AF-D in Alexandria, Minnesota, on virtual channel 41, which rebroadcasts KPXM-TV
 K34AG-D in Parowan/Enoch, etc., Utah
 K34AI-D in La Pine, Oregon
 K34BL-D in Lovelock, Nevada
 K34CB-D in Lemhi, etc., Idaho
 K34CM-D in Ely, Nevada
 K34CR-D in Alamogordo, etc., New Mexico
 K34CX-D in Apple Valley, Utah
 K34DC-D in Astoria, Oregon, on virtual channel 6, which rebroadcasts KOIN
 K34DI-D in Pendleton, Oregon
 K34DJ-D in Phoenix, etc., Oregon
 K34DN-D in Whitewater, Montana
 K34DP-D in Plevna, Montana
 K34EE-D in Prescott-Cottonwood, Arizona, on virtual channel 61, which rebroadcasts KASW
 K34EU-D in Morongo Valley, California, on virtual channel 34
 K34FO-D in Alton, Utah
 K34FP-D in Valmy, Nevada
 K34FQ-D in Roy, New Mexico
 K34FR-D in Randolph & Woodruff, Utah
 K34FV-D in Duchesne, Utah, on virtual channel 9, which rebroadcasts KUEN
 K34GI-D in Trinidad, Colorado
 K34GM-D in Pierre, South Dakota
 K34GO-D in Fillmore, Utah
 K34GY-D in Culbertson, Montana
 K34HE-D in Elko, Nevada
 K34HF-D in Cuba, New Mexico
 K34HO-D in Willmar, Minnesota, on virtual channel 34
 K34IB-D in Decatur, Nebraska
 K34IC-D in Glide, Oregon
 K34IN-D in Beaver, Oklahoma
 K34IS-D in Kilauea, Hawaii
 K34IW-D in Hanna, etc., Utah
 K34IY-D in Boulder, Utah
 K34JB-D in Vernal, etc., Utah, on virtual channel 11, which rebroadcasts KBYU-TV
 K34JD-D in Manila, etc., Utah
 K34JJ-D in Hollis, Oklahoma
 K34JK-D in Elk City, Oklahoma
 K34JR-D in Madras, Oregon
 K34JX-D in St. James, Minnesota
 K34KE-D in Hood River, Oregon, on virtual channel 8, which rebroadcasts KGW
 K34KJ-D in Crescent City, etc., California
 K34KK-D in Litchfield, California
 K34KL-D in Powers, Oregon
 K34KM-D in Basalt, Colorado
 K34KO-D in Tulia, Texas
 K34KP-D in Clear Creek, Utah
 K34KQ-D in Fountain Green, Utah
 K34KZ-D in Hobbs, New Mexico
 K34LE-D in Shurz, Nevada
 K34LI-D in Jean, Nevada
 K34LJ-D in Kabetogama, Minnesota
 K34LK-D in Beaumont, Texas
 K34LN-D in Cheyenne Wells, Colorado
 K34LS-D in Seneca, Oregon
 K34MC-D in Williams, Minnesota
 K34ME-D in Overton, Nevada
 K34MF-D in Orovada, Nevada
 K34MG-D in Garden Valley, Idaho
 K34MX-D in Odessa, Texas
 K34MZ-D in Prosser, Washington
 K34NA-D in Tampico, Montana
 K34NB-D in Lubbock, Texas
 K34NC-D in Fish Creek, etc., Idaho
 K34ND-D in Moses Lake, Washington
 K34NF-D in Soda Springs, Idaho
 K34NG-D in La Grande, Oregon
 K34NI-D in Florence, Oregon
 K34NL-D in Sargents, Colorado
 K34NM-D in Lamar, Colorado
 K34NN-D in Brewster & Pateros, Washington
 K34NO-D in Grants Pass, Oregon
 K34NP-D in Red Lake, Minnesota, on virtual channel 26, which rebroadcasts WFTC
 K34NQ-D in Memphis, Texas
 K34NT-D in Hanksville, Utah
 K34NU-D in Jackson, Minnesota
 K34NV-D in Frost, Minnesota
 K34NW-D in Rural Garfield County, Utah
 K34NY-D in Escalante, Utah
 K34NZ-D in Fremont, Utah
 K34OA-D in Washington, etc., Utah, on virtual channel 14, which rebroadcasts KJZZ-TV
 K34OB-D in Howard, Montana
 K34OD-D in Tropic, etc., Utah
 K34OF-D in Caineville, Utah
 K34OH-D in Montpelier, Idaho
 K34OI-D in Logan, Utah
 K34OJ-D in Park City, Utah, on virtual channel 7, which rebroadcasts KUED
 K34OK-D in Coalville, Utah
 K34OL-D in Wanship, Utah
 K34OM-D in Henefer, etc., Utah
 K34ON-D in Samak, Utah
 K34OQ-D in Beaver etc., Utah
 K34OS-D in Sterling/South Logan County, Colorado, on virtual channel 31, which rebroadcasts KDVR
 K34OT-D in Toquerville & Leeds, Utah, on virtual channel 11, which rebroadcasts KBYU-TV
 K34OU-D in Beryl/Modena, etc., Utah
 K34OV-D in Washington, etc., Utah
 K34OW-D in Yreka, California
 K34OX-D in Delta, Oak City, etc., Utah
 K34PA-D in Garrison, etc., Utah
 K34PB-D in Emery, Utah
 K34PC-D in Green River, Utah
 K34PD-D in Spring Glen, Utah
 K34PE-D in Dolan Springs, Arizona
 K34PF-D in Scofield, Utah
 K34PG-D in Payson, Arizona, on virtual channel 38, which rebroadcasts K19IP-D
 K34PH-D in Ferron, Utah
 K34PJ-D in Tillamook, Oregon, on virtual channel 2, which rebroadcasts KATU
 K34PK-D in Tohatchi, New Mexico
 K34PQ-D in Plains, Montana
 K34PT-D in Julesburg, Colorado, on virtual channel 2, which rebroadcasts KWGN-TV
 K34PU-D in Crested Butte, Colorado
 K34PV-D in Cortez, Colorado
 K34PW-D in Haxtun, Colorado, on virtual channel 9, which rebroadcasts KUSA
 K34PY-D in Mina/Luning, Nevada
 K34QB-D in Vail, Colorado, on virtual channel 45, which rebroadcasts K36DB-CD
 K34QC-D in Lewiston, Idaho
 K34QD-D in Bayfield & Ignacio, Colorado
 K34QJ-D in Panaca, Nevada
 K34QL-D in Fallon, Nevada
 K34QX-D in Roundup, Montana
 K34QY-D in Golden Valley, Arizona
 K38JS-D in Antimony, Utah
 K41KX-D in Joplin, Missouri
 K41MZ-D in Livingston, etc., Montana
 K43MD-D in Blanding/Monticello, Utah, on virtual channel 30, which rebroadcasts KUCW
 K51AL-D in Olivia, Minnesota, on virtual channel 29, which rebroadcasts WFTC
 K51KO-D in Joplin, Montana
 KACA-LD in Modesto, California, on virtual channel 34
 KASN in Pine Bluff, Arkansas
 KCBT-LD in Bakersfield, California
 KCDO-TV (DRT) in Sidney, Nebraska, on virtual channel 3
 KCYH-LD in Ardmore, Oklahoma
 KEVA-LD in Boise, Idaho, an ATSC 3.0 station.
 KEYE-TV in Austin, Texas
 KEZT-CD in Sacramento, California, on virtual channel 23, which rebroadcasts KUVS-DT
 KFSF-DT in Vallejo, California, on virtual channel 66
 KGPE in Fresno, California
 KGPX-TV in Spokane, Washington
 KHWB-LD in Eugene, Oregon
 KIAH in Houston, Texas, on virtual channel 39
 KIDV-LD in Albany, Texas
 KMEX-DT in Los Angeles, California, on virtual channel 34
 KMJD-LD in Kalispell, Montana
 KMSS-TV in Shreveport, Louisiana
 KMYT-TV in Tulsa, Oklahoma
 KOMI-CD in Woodward, Oklahoma
 KQIN in Davenport, Iowa
 KRCR-TV in Redding, California
 KSJF-CD in Poteau, Oklahoma
 KSOY-LD in McAllen, Texas
 KSPR-LD in Springfield, Missouri
 KSTR-DT in Irving, Texas, an ATSC 3.0 station, on virtual channel 49
 KSWL-LD in Lake Charles, Louisiana
 KTAS in San Luis Obispo, California
 KTCA-TV in Saint Paul, Minnesota, on virtual channel 2
 KTLP-LD in Pueblo, Colorado
 KTWC-LD in Crockett, Texas
 KUNP-LD in Portland, Oregon, on virtual channel 47, which rebroadcasts KUNP
 KUSD-TV in Vermillion, South Dakota
 KUTV in Salt Lake City, Utah, on virtual channel 2
 KUVE-DT in Green Valley, Arizona
 KVDO-LD in Albany, Oregon
 KVHP-LD in Jasper, Texas
 KVPA-LD in Phoenix, Arizona, on virtual channel 42
 KWDK in Tacoma, Washington, on virtual channel 56
 KWGN-TV in Denver, Colorado, an ATSC 3.0 station, on virtual channel 2
 KWRW-LD in Oklahoma City, Oklahoma
 KXTF in Twin Falls, Idaho
 KYDF-LD in Corpus Christi, Texas
 W34DQ-D in Pittsburg, New Hampshire
 W34DV-D in Booneville, Mississippi
 W34DX-D in West Asheville, North Carolina
 W34EP-D in Sapphire Valley, etc., North Carolina
 W34EQ-D in Bangor, Maine
 W34ER-D in Clarksdale, Mississippi
 W34EY-D in Huntsville, Alabama
 W34FB-D in Hamilton, Alabama
 W34FC-D in La Crosse, Wisconsin
 W34FE-D in Parkersburg, West Virginia
 W34FF-D in Panama City, Florida
 W34FH-D in Marion, etc., North Carolina, on virtual channel 18, which rebroadcasts WBTV
 W34FK-D in Anasco, Puerto Rico, on virtual channel 33
 W34FL-D in Harrisburg/Lancaster, Pennsylvania
 W34FO-D in Augusta, Georgia
 W34FP-D in Eastlake, Ohio, on virtual channel 25, which rebroadcasts WVIZ
 W34FR-D in Ithaca, New York
 W34FW-D in Jasper, Florida
 W34FX-D in Montrose, Georgia
 WACN-LD in Raleigh, North Carolina, on virtual channel 34
 WATC-DT in Atlanta, Georgia, on virtual channel 57
 WBGS-LD in Bowling Green, Kentucky
 WBIH in Selma, Alabama
 WBXJ-CD in Jacksonville, Florida
 WCIA in Champaign, Illinois
 WCMV in Cadillac, Michigan
 WCPX-TV in Chicago, Illinois, on virtual channel 38
 WDAF-TV in Kansas City, Missouri, on virtual channel 4
 WDNP-LD in St. Petersburg, Florida, on virtual channel 36
 WFBI-LD in South East Memphis, Tennessee
 WFTX-TV in Cape Coral, Florida
 WFXT in Boston, Massachusetts, on virtual channel 25
 WFXV in Utica, New York
 WGWG in Charleston, South Carolina
 WHBR in Pensacola, Florida
 WHDT in Stuart, Florida
 WHSV-TV (DRT) in Massanutten, Virginia, on virtual channel 3
 WIDO-LD in Wilmington, North Carolina
 WIDP in Guayama, Puerto Rico, on virtual channel 46
 WIPX-LD in Indianapolis, Indiana, on virtual channel 34
 WISE-TV in Fort Wayne, Indiana
 WIVM-LD in Canton, Ohio, on virtual channel 39
 WJHJ-LD in Newport News, etc., Virginia
 WJNK-LD in Nashville, Tennessee, on virtual channel 34.
 WKBD-TV in Detroit, Michigan, on virtual channel 50
 WKBW-TV in Buffalo, New York
 WKEF in Dayton, Ohio
 WKMJ-TV in Louisville, Kentucky
 WMHT in Schenectady, New York
 WNPB-TV in Morgantown, West Virginia, on virtual channel 24
 WNSC-TV in Rock Hill, South Carolina, on virtual channel 30
 WOOD-TV in Grand Rapids, Michigan
 WPEM-LD in Lumberton, North Carolina
 WPPX-TV in Wilmington, Delaware, on virtual channel 61
 WPXI (DRT) in New Castle, Pennsylvania, on virtual channel 11
 WPXN-TV in New York, New York, on virtual channel 31
 WPXT in Portland, Maine
 WQEC in Quincy, Illinois
 WRBJ-TV in Magee, Mississippi
 WRC-TV in Washington, D.C., on virtual channel 4
 WRJT-LD in Wausau, Wisconsin
 WSIL-TV in Harrisburg, Illinois
 WSJZ-LD in Salisbury, Maryland
 WSLS-TV in Roanoke, Virginia
 WSST-TV in Cordele, Georgia
 WSWB in Scranton, Pennsylvania
 WTGL in Leesburg, Florida, uses WUCF-TV's spectrum, on virtual channel 45
 WTIC-TV in Hartford, Connecticut, on virtual channel 61
 WUCF-TV in Orlando, Florida, on virtual channel 21
 WVLA-TV in Baton Rouge, Louisiana
 WVLT-TV in Knoxville, Tennessee
 WWKQ-LD in Quebradillas, Puerto Rico
 WWRS-TV in Mayville, Wisconsin, on virtual channel 52
 WXVK-LD in Columbus, Georgia
 WYBE-CD in Pinehurst, North Carolina, on virtual channel 44
 WYCI in Saranac Lake, New York
 WYJJ-LD in Jackson, Tennessee
 WZDC-CD in Washington D.C., uses WRC-TV's spectrum, on virtual channel 44
 WZTD-LD in Richmond, Virginia

The following stations, which are no longer licensed, formerly broadcast on digital channel 34:
 K34EF-D in Kingman, Arizona
 K34FI-D in Bozeman, Montana
 K34IF-D in Wallowa, Oregon
 K34IV-D in Fruitland, Utah
 K34JA-D in Richfield, etc., Utah
 K34KX-D in Rolla, Missouri
 K34KY-D in Mountain Home, Idaho
 K34LC-D in Rifle, etc., Colorado
 K34LR-D in Salinas, California
 K34OG-D in Little America, etc., Wyoming
 K34PO-D in Billings, Montana
 K34QA-D in Klamath Falls, Oregon
 KEFB in Ames, Iowa
 KFNM-LD in Farmington, New Mexico
 KMZM-LD in Cedar Falls, Iowa
 KQLD-LD in Lincoln, Nebraska
 W34ED-D in Trujillo Alto, Puerto Rico
 W34EH-D in Champaign, Illinois
 W34FV-D in Soperton, Georgia
 WHTV in Jackson, Michigan

References

34 digital